Martina Alzini (born 10 February 1997) is an Italian professional racing cyclist, who currently rides for UCI Women's Continental Team

Major results
2015
 3rd Scratch, 6 giorni delle rose - Fiorenzuola (Under-23)
 5th Road race, UEC European Junior Road Championships
 9th Trofeo Alfredo Binda-Comune di Cittiglio Juniors
2016
 2nd  Team Pursuit, UEC European Under-23 Track Championships (with Claudia Cretti, Michela Maltese and Francesca Pattaro)
 2nd Points race, 6 giorni delle rose - Fiorenzuola
2018
 7th Gran Premio della Liberazione
2021
 3rd Ronde de Mouscron 
 5th Vuelta a la Comunitat Valenciana Feminas
 7th GP Eco–Struct

See also
 List of 2016 UCI Women's Teams and riders

References

External links
 

1997 births
Living people
Italian female cyclists
Italian track cyclists
People from Legnano
Cyclists at the 2019 European Games
European Games medalists in cycling
European Games gold medalists for Italy
Cyclists at the 2020 Summer Olympics
Olympic cyclists of Italy
Cyclists from the Metropolitan City of Milan
21st-century Italian women
UCI Track Cycling World Champions (women)